Goian Island is the largest island of the Republic of Moldova. It is part of the Dubăsari district in the separatist region of Transnistria.

Islands of Moldova